Na istarski način is a Croatian film directed by Vladimir Fulgosi. It was released in 1985.

External links
 

1985 films
Croatian drama films
1980s Croatian-language films
Yugoslav drama films